The 1990 Oklahoma State Cowboys football team represented Oklahoma State University in the 1990 NCAA Division I FBS football season. The Cowboys were led by ninth year head coach Pat Jones and played their home games at Lewis Field in Stillwater, Oklahoma. They were a member of the Big 8 Conference.

Schedule

Personnel

Season summary

at Florida

After the season

The 1991 NFL Draft was held on April 21–22, 1991. The following Cowboys were selected.

References

Oklahoma State
Oklahoma State Cowboys football seasons
Oklahoma State Cowboys football